"Sliver" is a song by the American rock band Nirvana, written by vocalist and guitarist Kurt Cobain and bassist Krist Novoselic.

The song was released as a non-album single by the band's then record label, Sub Pop, in September 1990. The same recording was re-released on the compilation album Incesticide by DGC in December 1992, and a new music video directed by Kevin Kerslake was released to promote the album.

Origin and recording

Early history
"Sliver" was written in 1990. According to the 1993 biography Come As You Are: The Story of Nirvana by Michael Azerrad, the song was written during a rehearsal with Dan Peters, who briefly played the drums with Nirvana while the future of his band, Mudhoney, was uncertain. According to Azerrad, the lyrics to "Sliver" were written shortly before they were recorded, although an acoustic demo of the song, first released on Nirvana box set With the Lights Out in November 2004, suggests that Cobain had written some of the lyrics before entering the studio to record the vocals. "I decided I wanted to write the most ridiculous pop song I had ever written," Cobain explained to Azerrad, in order "to prepare people for the next album," which became their 1991 release, Nevermind.

"Sliver" single

Most of the song's instruments were recorded by Jack Endino at Reciprocal Recording in Seattle, Washington on July 11, 1990, during a studio break by the Sub Pop band, TAD "We called Tad up and asked if we could come over and record the song," Cobain recalled in a Melody Maker interview with journalist Push in December 1990. "We used their instruments while they sat around eating. But that's nothing new...the key to a successful album is to get the fuck out of the studio before you're sick of the songs." With Peters on drums, the band recorded the song's music in less than an hour. Two weeks later, on July 24, Cobain returned to the studio and recorded his vocals as well as an additional guitar with Endino, who then mixed the track.

Cobain was pleased with the recording, telling Azerrad, "It has a massive naïveté to it. It was done so fast and raw and perfect that I don't think we could capture that again if we decided to rerecord it. It's just one of those recordings that happened and you can't try to reproduce it.

Unlike most Nirvana songs, "Sliver" was recorded in the studio before it had ever been played live. Its live debut was on September 22, 1990, at the Motor Sports International Garage in Seattle, the only show that Peters ever played with the band. "Sliver" also represents Peters' only appearance on a Nirvana studio recording. Cobain was happy with the time Peters spent with Nirvana, telling Azerrad, "The chemistry was definitely there...We could have ended up writing some really good songs together." As Nirvana bassist Krist Novoselic explained, however, "If Dan were to have joined our band it would've been certain that Mudhoney was finished, and we didn't want to be responsible for that."

Post-"Sliver" single

In December 1992, a live version of "Sliver," recorded at Del Mar Fairgrounds in Del Mar, California on December 28, 1991, was released as a b-side on the fourth and final Nevermind single, for the song, "In Bloom."

The same month, the studio version of "Sliver" appeared on Incesticide, a rarities compilation released in the wake of the surprising success of the band's major label debut, Nevermind. A music video was filmed for the song in March 1993 and first aired in May 1993. It was the only music video released from the album.

The final live performance of "Sliver" was at Nirvana's last concert, at Terminal Einz in Munich, Germany on March 1, 1994.

Composition and lyrics

Music

In an October 1990 interview in London, England, Cobain told Rupert Brankin-Frisby of Vice Lizard that the song "was inspired by 'cutie' bands like the Vaselines, Beat Happening and Half Japanese." In a 1992 advertisement for Incesticide, he described it as "an experiment in dynamics and simplicity inspired by Half Japanese, ELP, and ELO."

Lyrics

According to Azerrad, "Sliver" contained the most literal lyrics that Cobain ever wrote, telling a story of a boy who was left with his grandparents for the day by his parents, had a difficult time eating dinner and playing, and insisted on being taken home until finally falling asleep after eating ice-cream and watching television, and later waking up in his "mother's arms." Despite the straightforward lyrics, the song was given an intentionally confusing title, with Cobain explaining, "I had a feeling if I called it 'Sliver,' most people would call it 'Silver.'"

Release
The "Sliver" single was first released on 7-inch vinyl in the US in 1990 by Sub Pop. The initial run of 3,000 copies was pressed on black, marbled blue, or clear pink vinyl. It was released on CD single, 7-inch vinyl and 12-inch vinyl in the UK in 1991 on the Tupelo record label, and peaked at number 90 on the UK Singles Chart. Noted music photographer Charles Peterson provided black and white photography. The single charted at number 23 in Ireland in 1992, due to the success of the band's second album, Nevermind, released in September 1991.

Following its re-release on Incesticide in December 1992, the song was sent to radio and reached number 19 on the US Modern Rock Tracks chart in early 1993. The "Sliver" single re-charted at number 77 on the UK Singles Chart in December 1992, due to the release of Incesticide.

The Incesticide and CD single versions omitted a phone conversation between a hungover Novoselic and Sub Pop co-founder Jonathan Poneman that appears at the end of the song in the vinyl single. The exchange, which ended with a confused-sounding Novoselic advising Poneman to call back later that day, was accidentally recorded on Novoselic's answering machine.

The single was re-released on silver 7-inch vinyl on 26 March 2021 by Jackpot Records and it is limited to 1,000 copies.

Critical reception

Reviewing the single in a 1990 issue of Melody Maker, Everett True wrote, "Sure, the vocals are lazily throat splitting, the guitars belligerently grungy, the bass up and out of place . . . but check the melodies, damn fools, check the melodies. The only reason this isn't 'Single Of The Week' is because three even mightier singles were released this week."

Legacy

In a July 2018 retrospective review of Incesticide, Jenny Pelly  of Pitchfork wrote that "Sliver" was "a hilarious caricature" of a pop song that featured "the exaggerated naivete and cool simplicity of Olympia bands that Cobain loved, like Beat Happening and the Go Team.

In 2011, NME ranked the song at number nine on their list of the 10 best Nirvana songs. In 2015, Rolling Stone placed it at number three on their ranking of 102 Nirvana songs. In 2020, it was ranked at number one on Kerrang!'s The 20 Greatest Nirvana Songs - Ranked list, with Sam Law calling it "a finely-balanced moment in time, powered by the frontman’s tortured intelligence but not yet corrupted by the anguish and addiction that would eventually spell his demise."

Rivers Cuomo, of the American alternative rock band Weezer, named "Sliver" as the song that made the biggest impact on his life in his early 20s, and shared his memory of hearing it for the first time in a 2015 Pitchfork interview: "It was just one of those things where, by the time it got through the first chorus, I was just running around the store ... [It] had the simplicity of the Velvet Underground in the structure and the chords ... [and] the melody and the major chord progression of the pop music I love, like ABBA, but also this sense of destructiveness ... and it came out in this new hybrid style."

In 2022, Paris Jackson paid homage to the music video for "Sliver" with the music video for her song "Lighthouse" which was filmed in a similar setting and also included a picture of Kurt Cobain.

Music video

The music video for "Sliver" was not filmed until March 1993. This meant that when the song featured on ITV's The Chart Show indie chart in February 1991 in the UK that only the single's cover art was shown with the audio of the song playing over it.

The song's music video was directed by Kevin Kerslake, who had also directed the videos for the band's three previous singles, "Come As You Are," "Lithium" and "In Bloom." The video starts with Cobain's infant daughter Frances Bean Cobain dancing to the song's bassline, held by Kurt from behind while his arms were sticking out of two holes he cut through a piece of cardboard, then switches to the band performing the song in Cobain's garage. The video shows Dave Grohl on drums, although he does not appear on the track. Cobain does not play the guitar in the video, only singing into a microphone while wearing a red and black striped mohair sweater his wife, Courtney Love, had bought for him from a fan after a Nirvana show in Belfast, Northern Ireland. Cobain's garage itself had been decorated with toys, posters and artifacts he had collected over several years, and kept in storage since before Nevermind was recorded in May 1991. Among the items featured in the video is a Chim-Chim toy which had been given to Cobain by the Japanese rock band Shonen Knife as a present.

The video was accepted by MTV in May, but frames featuring the logos of the magazines Maximumrockandroll and Better Homes and Gardens had to be removed due to the network's rules on product placement.

Track listings

1990 US 7 inch single
"Sliver" (Cobain, Novoselic) – 3:55 – 2:16
"Dive" (Cobain, Novoselic) – 3:55

1991 UK 7 inch single
"Sliver" (Cobain, Novoselic) – 2:16
"Dive" (Cobain, Novoselic) – 3:55

1991 UK 12 inch single
"Sliver" (Cobain, Novoselic) – 2:16
"Dive" (Cobain, Novoselic) – 3:55
"About a Girl" (live February 9, 1990, at the Pine Street Theatre, Portland, OR) 

1991 UK CD single
"Sliver" (Cobain, Novoselic) – 2:16
"Dive" (Cobain, Novoselic) – 3:55
"About a Girl" (live February 9, 1990, at the Pine Street Theatre, Portland, OR) 
"Spank Thru" (live February 9, 1990, at the Pine Street Theatre, Portland, OR) 

2021 US 7 inch single
"Sliver" (Cobain, Novoselic) – 2:16
"Dive" (Cobain, Novoselic) – 3:55

Charts

Original 1990 US release

1991 UK release

1992 re-release

1993 US promo release

Accolades

Other releases

The solo acoustic demo that originally appeared on With the Lights Out was re-released on the compilation album, Sliver: The Best of the Box, in November 2005.

A live version, recorded at  the Paramount Theatre in Seattle on October 31, 1991, appeared on the live video, Live at the Paramount, in September 2011.

A live version, recorded at the Paradiso in Amsterdam, the Netherlands on November 25, 1991, appeared on the live video, Live! Tonight! Sold Out!!, in November 1994. The full show was released on CD and Blu-ray in November 2021, on the 30th-anniversary "Deluxe" and "Super Deluxe" versions of Nevermind.

The 30th-anniversary "Deluxe" and "Super Deluxe" versions of Nevermind featured three other live versions of "Sliver." In addition to the full Del Mar show, the set included the band's complete performances at The Palace in Melbourne, Australia on February 2, 1992, and the Nakano Sunplaza in Tokyo, Japan on February 19, 1992, both of which featured versions of the song.

A live version, recorded at the 1992 Reading Festival in Reading, England on August 30, 1992, appeared on Live at Reading, released in November 2009 on CD and DVD.

A live version, recorded at the Springfield Civic Center in Springfield, Massachusetts on November 10, 1993, appeared on the live compilation, From the Muddy Banks of the Wishkah, released in November 1996.

A live version, recorded at Pier 48, in Seattle on December 13, 1993, was released on the live video Live and Loud in September 2013.

Cover versions

Personnel
Kurt Cobain: vocals, guitar
Krist Novoselic: bass guitar
Dan Peters: drums
Jack Endino: recording and mixing engineer, producer

Notes

References

1990 singles
Nirvana (band) songs
Songs written by Kurt Cobain
Sub Pop singles
1990 songs
Music videos directed by Kevin Kerslake
American pop punk songs